Donegal railway station served Donegal in County Donegal, Ireland. It was served by connections to Derry, Killybegs and Ballyshannon.

History
The station opened on 16 September 1889 on the West Donegal Railway line from Stranorlar to Donegal. In 1906 the station, along with the rest of the line became part of the County Donegal Railways Joint Committee. The station closed on 1 January 1960. However such was the attachment to the Donegal railways that after the line from Donegal town to Ballyshannon closed down in 1959, two of the railway workers continued to operate a freight service between the two towns for a month before the railway bosses in Dublin realised what was happening.

Current status
The station buildings have since been restored by the County Donegal Railway Restoration Society, and from 1995 the home of the Donegal Railway Centre.

Rail accident
In 1949, two trains collided head-on near Donegal. A driver and two passengers were killed.

Routes

References

Railway Station
Disused railway stations in County Donegal
Railway stations closed in 1960
Railway stations opened in 1889